Dargouth Turkish Bath is a Turkish bath in the old quarter of Tripoli, Libya. The bath was established in 1081 AH/(1670 AD or 1671 AD). It is annexed to Sidi Darghouth Mosque and tomb, whence it derives its name. The mosque and tomb in turn derive their names from the name of the Ottoman naval commander Turgut.

Buildings and structures in Tripoli, Libya
Buildings and structures completed in 1671
1670s establishments in Africa